Clepsydra is a genus of diatoms, including the species Clepsydra truganiniae.  It was found in Tasmania.

References

External links
Paper on new genus

Diatom genera
Natural history of Tasmania